Christina Schwab (née Ripp) (born July 31, 1980) is an American Paralympic basketball player and distance track/road racer.

Competition
Schwab started competing for Paralympic Games in 2000 where she got into the 5th place at the 2000 Summer Paralympics. Four years later she won a gold medal in Athens, Greece for wheelchair basketball competition and in 2008 she won her second gold in Beijing, China. She was also awarded gold at International Wheelchair Basketball Federation Gold Cup and won bronze medal in track and field trials. She used to get first place at National championships from 2002 to 2004. In 2006, Christina won a silver medal at IWBF Gold Cup and bronze one at IPC World Championships. She also got into the first place at Boston Marathon which was in 2003 and five years later got the same spot at the North American Cup.

Personal life
In December 2005, Schwab received a bachelor's degree in community health from the University of Illinois. Schwab then moved to Colorado and helped start the Denver Rolling Nuggets, a women's wheelchair basketball team. In 2011, she married CJ Schwab and they reside in Edgerton, Wisconsin. Schwab is currently working towards her master's degree while coaching the women's wheelchair basketball team at the University of Wisconsin-Whitewater. She has a pretty cool brother named Jay ;)

References

External links
  (2000–2008)
  (2012, 2016)

1980 births
Living people
American female wheelchair racers
American women's wheelchair basketball players
Paralympic wheelchair basketball players of the United States
Paralympic gold medalists for the United States
Paralympic medalists in wheelchair basketball
Wheelchair basketball players at the 2000 Summer Paralympics
Wheelchair basketball players at the 2004 Summer Paralympics
Wheelchair basketball players at the 2008 Summer Paralympics
Wheelchair basketball players at the 2012 Summer Paralympics
Wheelchair basketball players at the 2016 Summer Paralympics
Medalists at the 2004 Summer Paralympics
Medalists at the 2008 Summer Paralympics
Medalists at the 2016 Summer Paralympics
People from Arvada, Colorado
University of Illinois alumni
Illinois Fighting Illini Paralympic athletes
People with paraplegia
21st-century American women
20th-century American women